The European Synchrotron Radiation Facility (ESRF) is a joint research facility situated in Grenoble, France, supported by 22 countries (13 member countries: France, Germany, Italy, the UK, Spain, Switzerland, Belgium, the Netherlands, Denmark, Finland, Norway, Sweden, Russia; and 9 associate countries: Austria, Portugal, Israel, Poland, the Czech Republic, Hungary, Slovakia, India and South Africa).

Some 8,000 scientists visit this particle accelerator each year, conducting upwards of 2,000 experiments and producing around 1,800 scientific publications.

History 
Inaugurated in September 1994, it has an annual budget of around 100 million euros, employs over 630 people and is host to more than  visiting scientists each year.

In 2009, the ESRF began a first major improvement in its capacities. With the creation of the new ultra-stable experimental hall of  8,000 m2 in 2015, its X-rays are 100 times more powerful, with a power of 100 billion times that of hospital radiography devices.

The second improvement to the facilities, now named the "Extremely Brilliant Source" (ESRF-EBS), took place between 2018 and 2020. and again improved its X-ray power by a factor of 100, or 10,000 billion more powerful than X-rays used in the medical field. It became the first fourth-generation high-energy synchrotron in the world.

The first electron beam tests began on November 28, 2019.  The facility reopened to users on August 25, 2020.

General description 

The ESRF physical plant consists of two main buildings: the experiment hall, containing the 844 metre circumference ring and forty tangential beamlines; and a block of laboratories, preparation suites, and offices connected to the ring by a pedestrian bridge. The linear accelerator electron gun and smaller booster ring used to bring the beam to an operating energy of 6 GeV are constructed within the main ring. Until recently bicycles were provided for use indoors in the ring's circumferential corridor. Unfortunately they have been removed after some minor accidents. But even before this it was not possible to cycle continuously all the way around, since some of the beamlines exit the hall.

Research at the ESRF focuses, in large part, on the use of X-ray radiation in fields as diverse as protein crystallography, earth science, paleontology, materials science, chemistry and physics. Facilities such as the ESRF offer a flux, energy range and resolution unachievable with conventional (laboratory) radiation sources.

Study results 
In 2014, ancient books destroyed by the eruption of Mount Vesuvius in 79 are read for the first time in the ESRF. These 1840 fragments were reduced to the status of charred cylinders.

In 2015, scientists from the University of Sheffield have used the ESRF's X-rays to study the blue and white feathers of the Jay and have found that birds use well-controlled changes to the nanostructure of their feathers to create the vivid colours of their plumage. This research opens new possibilities for creating non-fading, synthetic colours for paints and clothing.

In July 2016, a team of South Africa researchers scans a complete fossilized skeleton of a small dinosaur discovered in 2005 in South Africa and older than 200 million years. The dentition of heterodontosauridae scanned revealed palate bones of less than a millimeter thick.

On December 6, 2017, the journal Nature unveils the discovery at the European synchrotron of a new species of dinosaur with surprising characteristics and living about 72 million years ago. It is a biped, mix between a velociraptor, an ostrich and a swan with a crocodile muzzle and penguin wings. With a height of about 1.2 meters (4 ft) and with killer claws, he could hunt his prey on the ground or hunt by swimming in the water, which is a novelty for scientists in the study of dinosaurs.

In November 2021, researchers demonstrated a novel X-ray imaging technique, "HiP-CT", for 3D cellular-resolution scans of whole organs, using the ESRF's "Extremely Brilliant Source". The published online Human Organ Atlas includes the lungs from a donor who died with COVID-19.

Access 

The ESRF site forms part of the "Polygone Scientifique", lying at the confluence of the rivers Drac and Isère about 1.5 km from the centre of Grenoble. It is served by Grenoble tramway system and local bus lines of Semitag (C6, 22 and 54). It is served by Grenoble–Isère Airport and Lyon–Saint-Exupéry Airport.

The Centre national de la recherche scientifique (CNRS) has an institute just across the road.

People 
 Roderick MacKinnon, Nobel Prize in Chemistry 2003, have caried out experiments on beamline ID13.
 Venki Ramakrishnan, Thomas A. Steitz, and Ada Yonath, Nobel Prize in Chemistry 2009, have used macromolecular crystallography beamlies (ID14-1, -2, -4; and ID29) at the ESRF.
 Brian Kobilka and Robert Lefkowitz, Nobel Prize in Chemistry 2012, have has carried out experiments mainly on beamline ID13.

See also
List of Synchrotron Radiation Facilities
European Research Area (ERA)
TANGO (control system originally developed at the ESRF)
The African Light Source (AfLS)

References

External links

ESRF.eu
Lightsources.org
24 hours at the X-ray factory by Richard Van Noorden on Nature

Science and technology in Grenoble
Synchrotron radiation facilities
Particle accelerators
History of physics
Science and technology in Europe
Research institutes in France
International research institutes
Science and Technology Facilities Council